Qezelcheh-ye Pashmak (also Romanized as Qezeljeh-ye Pashmak; also known as Qaranjeh Pashmak) is a village in Fajr Rural District, in the Central District of Gonbad-e Qabus County, Golestan Province, Iran. At the 2006 census, its population was 1,344, in 291 families.

References 

Populated places in Gonbad-e Kavus County